This is a list of films which have placed number one at the box office in Australia during 2020.

Highest-grossing films

References

See also
List of Australian films – Australian films by year
2020 in film

2020
Australia
2020 in Australian cinema